The Goose Creek Historic District is a rural landscape in the Goose Creek valley of Loudoun County, Virginia. The majority of the district is farmland, with areas of forest along Hogback Mountain. The area was settled by Quakers in the mid-18th century, represented by simple houses and the Goose Creek Meetinghouse Complex in Lincoln, separately listed on the National Register of Historic Places. About 270 buildings lie within the district. The district includes 44 stone buildings, reflecting the popularity of this material in the 18th and 19th centuries in this area. Many houses have outbuildings and barns built in a manner complementary to the dwellings. By the mid-19th century, materials turned to brick, with the Glebe of Shelburne Parish an NRHP-listed example of a brick Federal style house, as well as the Israel Janney House.

The Goose Creek Historic District was placed on the National Register of Historic Places on November 14, 1982.

References

External links
 Goose Creek Historic District at the Journey Through Hallowed Ground

Historic districts in Loudoun County, Virginia
National Register of Historic Places in Loudoun County, Virginia
Historic districts on the National Register of Historic Places in Virginia